Ceramonematidae is a family of nematodes belonging to the order Desmodorida.

Genera:
 Ceramonema Cobb, 1920
 Dasynemella Cobb, 1933
 Dasynemoides Chitwood, 1936
 Metadasynemella De Coninck, 1942
 Metadasynemoides Haspeslagh, 1973
 Pristionema Cobb, 1933
 Pselionema Cobb, 1933
 Pterygonema Gerlach, 1953

References

Nematodes